Dharmendra "Tinu" Suresh Desai is an Indian film director who made his Bollywood debut with 2016 horror film 1920: London starring Sharman Joshi and Meera Chopra. His next release for the year 2016, the Akshay Kumar starrer Rustom, is reportedly based on K. M. Nanavati v. State of Maharashtra's 1959 court case. The movie also features Ileana D'Cruz, Arjan Bajwa, and Esha Gupta in pivotal roles.

Filmography

References

External links

Living people
Indian male screenwriters
Hindi-language film directors
Year of birth missing (living people)